Governor Waite may refer to;

Davis Hanson Waite (1825–1901), 8th Governor of Colorado
Nicholas Waite (died c. 1715), Governor of Bombay from 1704 to 1708